Mian Muhammad Shabbir Ali Qureshi is a Pakistani politician who was former Minister of State for Housing and Works, in office since 4 October 2018. He had been a member of the National Assembly of Pakistan from August 2018 till January 2023. He is the son of politician Mohsin Ali Qureshi who also elected a member of the National Assembly twice from the same constituancy.

Political career
He was elected to the National Assembly of Pakistan from Constituency NA-181 (kot addu-I)  as an independent candidate in 2018 Pakistani general election.

Following his successful election, he announced to joined Pakistan Tehreek-e-Insaf (PTI) in August 2018.

On 11 September 2018, he was inducted into the federal cabinet of Prime Minister Imran Khan. On 4 October 2018, he was appointed as Minister of State for Housing and Works.

References

Living people
Pakistani MNAs 2018–2023
Year of birth missing (living people)
People from Muzaffargarh
Politicians from Muzaffargarh